Edith "Edie" Falco (born July 5, 1963) is an American actress. She is best known for portraying Carmela Soprano on the HBO series The Sopranos (1999–2007), and Nurse Jackie Peyton on the Showtime series Nurse Jackie (2009–2015). She also portrayed Diane Whittlesey in HBO's prison drama Oz (1997–2000).

In 2016, she played Sylvia Wittel on the web series Horace and Pete. In 2017, she portrayed defense attorney Leslie Abramson in the first season of the true crime anthology cubic series Law & Order True Crime. Falco's film work includes lead roles in Laws of Gravity (1992), for which she was nominated for the Independent Spirit Award for Best Female Lead and Judy Berlin (1999), and supporting roles in films including Sunshine State (2002), Freedomland (2006), The Comedian (2016), and Avatar: The Way of Water (2022). For her role in the 2011 Broadway revival of The House of Blue Leaves, she earned a nomination for a Tony Award for Best Featured Actress in a Play.

Falco has won two Golden Globe awards (from eleven nominations) and four Emmy awards (from fourteen nominations), all for individual performances.

Early life
Falco was born in the New York City borough of Brooklyn on July 5, 1963, the daughter of Judith Anderson, an actress, and Frank Falco, a jazz drummer who later worked for an advertising agency. Her father was of Italian descent and her mother had Swedish, English and Cornish (1/16th) ancestry. She has two brothers, Joseph and Paul, and a sister, Ruth. Her uncle is novelist, playwright, and poet Edward Falco. In 2012, Falco was the subject of an episode of Who Do You Think You Are? which focused on one of her ancestors, a Cornish master mariner from Penzance who was born at sea and died in 1840.

From the age of four, Falco was raised on Long Island, moving with her family to Hicksville, then North Babylon, and finally West Islip. As a child, she acted in plays at the Arena Players Repertory Theater in East Farmingdale, where her mother also performed. Her family eventually moved to Northport, where she attended high school and played Eliza Doolittle in a production of My Fair Lady during her senior year. Falco graduated from Northport High School in 1981. She attended the acting program at State University of New York at Purchase, and graduated in 1986 with a Bachelor of Fine Arts in acting.

Career

1987–1999: Early career

Early in her career, Falco made appearances on television shows like Law & Order and Homicide: Life on the Street. Tom Fontana, executive producer of Homicide, cast Falco as Eva Thormann, the wife of an injured police officer, after watching Falco's performance in Laws of Gravity, a 1992 film directed by Nick Gomez. Fontana said of her, "She's an actress who's unadorned by any embroidery. She does everything with such simplicity and honesty, it's breathtaking." A struggling actress at the time, Falco said her salary from these television episodes paid for one month's worth of rent.

Her first big break in films was a small speaking role in the 1994 Woody Allen film Bullets over Broadway. Her friendship with former SUNY Purchase classmate Eric Mendelsohn, who was the assistant to Allen's costume designer, Jeffrey Kurland, helped her to be cast in the role. Mendelsohn went on to direct Falco in his feature film Judy Berlin, for which he won Best Director honors at the Sundance Film Festival. Falco went on to star in Mendelsohn's next film 3 Backyards, for which he won Best Director a second time.

During this time, Falco appeared in the films Trust, Cop Land, Private Parts (nonspeaking part), Random Hearts, On Broadway, she appeared in the Tony Award-winning Side Man and in the revivals of Frankie and Johnny in the Clair de Lune opposite Stanley Tucci, and 'night, Mother opposite Brenda Blethyn.

In 1997, Falco started portraying prison officer Diane Whittlesey, in the HBO series Oz. Falco got the role after working with Fontana on Homicide.

1999–2007: The Sopranos
Falco received her breakout role in the HBO drama The Sopranos. The series premiered in 1999 and ended in 2007. She portrayed Carmela Soprano, wife of Mafia boss Tony Soprano. The series received wide acclaim, and is often considered to be one of the greatest television series of all time. For her role on the series, Falco won three Primetime Emmy Awards, two Golden Globe Awards, and five Screen Actors Guild Awards. As of 2008, Falco, The X-Files star Gillian Anderson, Ugly Betty star America Ferrera, and 30 Rocks Tina Fey were the only actresses to have received a Golden Globe, an Emmy, and a SAG Award in the same year. Falco won these awards in 2003 for her performance as Carmela Soprano during the fourth season of The Sopranos. During her tenure on The Sopranos, Falco appeared in films such as Freedomland and John Sayles' Sunshine State, for which she received the Los Angeles Film Critics Award for Best Supporting Actress. Falco also guest starred on the television series Will & Grace and had a recurring role on the second season of 30 Rock as Celeste Cunningham.

2007–2015: Nurse Jackie and Horace and Pete
Falco starred as the title character in the Showtime dark comedy series Nurse Jackie, which premiered on June 8, 2009, and ended on June 28, 2015. She won her fourth Primetime Emmy Award for the series.

In 2011, Falco played the part of Bananas in the Broadway revival of The House of Blue Leaves in New York City with Ben Stiller and Jennifer Jason Leigh, for which she received her first and only Tony Award nomination. It was announced in January 2013 that Falco would star in Liz Flahive's The Madrid off-Broadway. The limited engagement, directed by Leigh Silverman, began previews on February 5 with an official opening on February 26. Along with Falco, the play starred John Ellison, Christopher Evan Welch, Phoebe Strole, and Frances Sternhagen.

In 2016, Falco started portraying Sylvia Wittel on the Louis C.K. series Horace and Pete. The first episode was released on January 30, 2016, on C.K.'s website without any prior announcements. New episodes premiered weekly until the tenth episode was released on April 2, 2016.

2016–present: Continued television work
In September 2017, she began portraying Leslie Abramson in the first season of the NBC true crime anthology series Law & Order True Crime, subtitled The Menendez Murders.

In 2020, she appeared as the lead character in the Paul Attanasio TV series Tommy.

Falco originally reprised her breakout role as Carmela Soprano for the 2021 film The Many Saints of Newark, a prequel to The Sopranos. However, her scenes were cut from the finished film.

Falco also starred in the FX true crime series Impeachment: American Crime Story as Hillary Rodham Clinton, wife of President Bill Clinton.

Politics
During the 2004 U.S. presidential election, Falco appeared in a 30-second television commercial on behalf of Mothers Opposing Bush in which she said, "Mothers always put their children first. Mr. Bush, can you say the same?" 

Falco has become the spokesperson for Health Care for America Now  and appeared on CNN on June 25, 2009.

Personal life
In 2003, Falco was diagnosed with breast cancer. She chose not to make the news public until the following year. She has struggled with alcoholism and decided to become sober in the early 1990s after "one particular night of debauchery". She said in an interview that it was difficult to be around the hard-partying cast of The Sopranos, stating, "This cast, in particular, they really love to hang out and party. They make it look like fun. And it was fun for me! They spend a lot more time without me than with me, by my own choice. I'm always invited, and I'm always there for two minutes and I leave, because I can't live in that world anymore. It's too dangerous." She is an advocate of Alcoholics Anonymous' 12-step program.

Falco is a Buddhist. She adopted a son in 2005 and a daughter in 2008. She is a vegan and has worked with PETA on projects, including a public-service message urging parents to keep their children away from the circus. She told Parade magazine, "I believe this is at the base of everything bad in society—you can bring it back to cruelty to animals. If you don't have respect for the life of any kind, it will manifest in more obvious ways."

Filmography

Film

Television

Stage

Awards and nominations

References

External links

 
 
 
 
 

1963 births
20th-century American actresses
21st-century American actresses
Actresses from New York (state)
American Buddhists
American film actresses
American people of Cornish descent
American people of English descent
American people of Italian descent
American people of Swedish descent
American stage actresses
American television actresses
Best Drama Actress Golden Globe (television) winners
Living people
Outstanding Performance by a Lead Actress in a Comedy Series Primetime Emmy Award winners
Outstanding Performance by a Lead Actress in a Drama Series Primetime Emmy Award winners
Outstanding Performance by a Female Actor in a Drama Series Screen Actors Guild Award winners
People from Brooklyn
People from Hicksville, New York
People from North Babylon, New York
People from West Islip, New York
State University of New York at Purchase alumni
Theatre World Award winners